Branko Strupar (born 9 February 1970) is a Croatian-Belgian former professional footballer who played as a striker. In 1999, he became a naturalised Belgian. He consequently played for the Belgium national team with whom he played 17 matches and scored 5 times.

Early career 
Strupar was born in Zagreb, SR Croatia, Yugoslavia and started his footballing career with the local county tier club NK Špansko in the west of the city. He was scouted by a number of Croatian and European clubs in early 1990s and ultimately joined KRC Genk in 1994.

Club career 
Strupar played in Belgium for KRC Genk, winning promotion to the Belgian First Division in 1996 and becoming champion of Belgium with the same team in 1999. He also won the Belgian Golden Shoe as Player of the Year for 1998. In 1998, he finished as top scorer with 22 goals.  He moved to Derby County in December 1999, where he most notably scored the first British league goal of the year 2000 after two minutes against Watford (a game in which he scored twice). While at Derby Strupar gained popularity with his prolific scoring ability.

Despite an excellent goals-to-games ratio when fit, injuries curtailed his Derby career, and he was eventually given a free transfer, with which he returned to Croatia for a brief spell at Dinamo Zagreb to wind up his career.

International career
He made his debut for Belgium in an August 1999 friendly match against Finland, coming on as a 46th-minute substitute for Sandy Martens, and earned a total of 17 caps, scoring 5 goals. His final international was a June 2002 World Cup match against Tunisia.

Personal life
Strupar lives in his native Zagreb with his wife, daughters Dora and Laura and his son Bruno. He worked as a guest football commentator on the Croatian network RTL.

Honours 
Genk
 Belgian Cup: 1997–98
 Belgian First Division: 1998–99

Dinamo Zagreb
 Croatian Football Super Cup: 2003

Belgium
 FIFA Fair Play Trophy: 2002 World Cup

Individual
 Belgian First Division A top scorer: 1997–98 (22 goals) 
 Belgian Golden Shoe: 1998

References

BBC website

External links
 

1970 births
Living people
Footballers from Zagreb
Croatian emigrants to Belgium
Naturalised citizens of Belgium
Association football forwards
Yugoslav footballers
Croatian footballers
Belgian footballers
Belgium international footballers
UEFA Euro 2000 players
2002 FIFA World Cup players
K.R.C. Genk players
Derby County F.C. players
GNK Dinamo Zagreb players
Belgian Pro League players
Premier League players
Croatian Football League players
Belgian expatriate footballers
Expatriate footballers in England
Belgian expatriate sportspeople in England